The Iemma ministry (2005–2007) or First Iemma ministry is the 89th ministry of the Government of New South Wales, and was led by the 40th Premier Morris Iemma. It was the first of two occasions when Iemma was Premier.

The 1st Iemma Labor ministry was formed following the shock retirement of Bob Carr as Premier after Carr had the longest continuous service as Premier, from 1995 until 2005. Iemma succeeded Carr after a bitter inter-factional battle against Carl Scully who withdrew from the caucus contest after Iemma received backing from Labor's head office and powerbrokers in the dominant NSW Right of the Labor Party.

This ministry covers the period from 3 August 2005 until 2 April 2007, when the outcome of the 2007 state election was determined and Iemma re-elected for a second term.

Composition of ministry
The composition of the ministry was announced by Premier Iemma on 3 August 2005. Hours before the swearing in ceremony senior ministers Andrew Refshauge and Craig Knowles announced their resignations, resulting in a reshuffle. There was a further ministerial reshuffle on 17 February 2006.
In October 2006 Carl Scully was sacked from the ministry for misleading parliament. In November 2006 Milton Orkopoulos was charged with criminal offences and was sacked from the ministry.

 
Ministers are members of the Legislative Assembly unless otherwise noted.

See also

Members of the New South Wales Legislative Assembly, 2003–2007
Members of the New South Wales Legislative Council, 2003-2007

Notes

References

 

! colspan=3 style="border-top: 5px solid #cccccc" | New South Wales government ministries

New South Wales ministries
2005 establishments in Australia
2007 disestablishments in Australia
Australian Labor Party ministries in New South Wales